Cosmo James Petrich  is an Australian businessman.

He lives in Yungaburra, Queensland.

Career
Petrich has held the following positions:
 Deputy Chairman of Ports Corporation of Queensland, 1999–2009
 Chief Executive Officer of Cape York Peninsula Development Association, 1996–2005
 Executive Director of the Cattleman's Union of Australia
 Chair of the Cape York Financial Project
 Chairman of the Centre for Rural and Remote Mental Health–Queensland
 Chairman of the Palm Island Community Company
 Member of the Land Tribunal of Queensland from 2004 to 2008

Awards and recognition
Petrich was awarded the Centenary Medal in 2001, cited for:
"long service and leadership to the grazing industry in the Northern Territory and Queensland"

He was made an officer of the Order of Australia (AM) in the 2005, cited for:
"service to the rural community, particularly regional and economic development on Cape York Peninsula" 

Petrich is a Fellow of the Australian Institute of Company Directors.

External links
 Brisbane Institute (25 May 2000) "The Cape York Partnership Plan"

References

Members of the Order of Australia
Living people
Year of birth missing (living people)
Recipients of the Centenary Medal
Fellows of the Australian Institute of Company Directors